The Primera División de Fútbol Profesional Apertura 2006 season (officially "Torneo Apertura 2006") started on August 12, 2006 and concluded on December 17.

Apertura 2006 teams

Team information

Personnel and sponsoring

Managerial changes

Before the season

During the season

Apertura 2006 standings

4th place playoff
The fourth place match was played on November 30. The winner advances to the semifinals.

Bracket

Semifinals
The team with the lower league position played home in the 1st leg. The 1st legs were played on December 2 and December 3. The 2nd legs were played on December 9 and December 10.

1st Leg

2nd Leg

Final
The final game was played on December 17.

List of foreign players in the league
This is a list of foreign players in Apertura 2006. The following players:
have played at least one apetura game for the respective club.
have not been capped for the El Salvador national football team on any level, independently from the birthplace

A new rule was introduced this season that clubs can only have three foreign players per club and can only add a new player if there is an injury or player/s is released.

C.D. Águila
  Carlos Verdugo
  Juan Camilo Mejia
  Francisco Serrano
  Omar Axel Clazon

Alianza F.C.
  Juan José Ossandón 
  Juan Carlos Madrid
  Jhon Novoa
  Arturo Albarrán

Chalatenango
  Franklin Webster
  Marcelo Messias
  Marcelo Domínguez 
  Paulo De Oliveira

C.D. FAS
  Alejandro Bentos
  Nestor Ayala
  Paolo Suarez

C.D. Luis Ángel Firpo
  Hermes Martinez 
  Leonardo Pekarnik
  David Diah
  Pablo Tiscornia

 (player released mid season)
 Injury replacement player

Independiente Nacional 1906
  Alexander Obregón
  Miguel Solis
  Hugo Sariemento

A.D. Isidro Metapán
  Rodrigo Lagos
  William Reyes
  Jorge Esteban Ortíz

Once Municipal
  James Owusu-Ansah
  Ernesto Noel Aquino
  Libardo Barbajal
  Juan Carlos Reyes

San Salvador F.C.
  Paulo Cesar Rodriguez
  Evance Bennett
  Francisco Rivera
  Julian Barragan

Vista Hermosa
  Patricio Barroche
  Elder Figueroa
  Luis Torres Rodriguez
  Cristian Mosquera

External links
 Primera División de Fútbol Profesional Official Website

Primera División de Fútbol Profesional Apertura seasons
El
1